Wedell Østergaard (7 May 1924 – 21 March 1995) was a Danish cyclist. He competed in the individual and team road race events at the 1952 Summer Olympics.

References

External links
 

1924 births
1995 deaths
Danish male cyclists
Olympic cyclists of Denmark
Cyclists at the 1952 Summer Olympics
People from Gentofte Municipality
Sportspeople from the Capital Region of Denmark